Mohammad Wasim Abbasi (born 8 August 1978) is a Pakistani-Dutch cricket coach and cricketer who played for both the Pakistan and Dutch cricket teams. Previously, he played in 18 Test matches and 25 One Day Internationals from 1996 to 2000 for the Pakistan national cricket team.

Personal life
As of February 2017, Wasim was living in Islamabad, where he works as a television expert on cricket and runs a cricket academy.

He's a YouTuber too, with his own channel named Bol Wasim where he presents in-depth analysis of cricket.

Cricket career

Career in Pakistan

He has scored two Test centuries for Pakistan including one on Test debut. His debut came against New Zealand in 1996, after scoring a duck in the first innings he went on to record 109 in the second innings batting at number 7. He gradually moved up the order in subsequent tests eventually to open the innings for Pakistan in Tests. His second test ton came against Zimbabwe, scoring 192 in Harare, 1998.

Wasim's most prominent experience in a Pakistani shirt came in Pakistan winning the Carlton and United Series in Australia against perhaps the two other most powerful sides in world cricket at the time, West Indies and hosts Australia. The series was low scoring and Wasim contributed significantly batting at number six.

His final Test appearance was in 2000 against Sri Lanka. After being discarded he was never recalled and when Pakistan decided upon a new set of youngsters in preparation for the 2003 World Cup.

Career in New Zealand
In 2002/03 season, Wasim moved to play first-class cricket for Otago in New Zealand. After 2 years, he left Otago and continued to play first-class cricket in Pakistan. Wasim also claims that he was also offered to play for New Zealand but he refused it, thinking that he might have a chance for Pakistan.

Career in the Netherlands
In July 2014, Wasim played a 50-over game for the Netherlands against Scotland, after he acquired Dutch nationality after living in the country for several years – playing his cricket for Sparta 1888 and Dosti Amsterdam. Wasim was a regular for the North Holland Hurricanes in the North Sea Pro Series that season and also turned out for Netherlands A in the Continental T20 Championship in Schiedam.

Coaching career
In May 2018, Wasim was appointed head coach of the Sweden national cricket team. He assisted the team in its preparation for the 2018–19 ICC World Twenty20 Europe Qualifier.

Cricket administration
in December 2020, Wasim was appointed as chief selector for the Pakistan Cricket Board (PCB). 

In December 2022, he was sacked from the position of chief selector.

References

External links

 Twitter

1977 births
Living people
Dutch expatriates in Pakistan
Otago cricketers
Pakistan One Day International cricketers
Pakistan Test cricketers
Cricketers who made a century on Test debut
Rawalpindi cricketers
Cricketers from Rawalpindi
Pakistani cricketers
Rawalpindi B cricketers
Khan Research Laboratories cricketers
Zarai Taraqiati Bank Limited cricketers
Rawalpindi Rams cricketers
Dutch cricketers
Pakistani expatriate sportspeople in New Zealand
Pakistani emigrants to the Netherlands
Dutch people of Punjabi descent
Pakistani cricket commentators
Pakistani cricket coaches
Naturalised citizens of the Netherlands
Dutch cricket coaches